The football tournament at the 1981 Southeast Asian Games was held from 6 December to 15 December 1981 in Manila, Philippines.

Tournament

Group stage

Group A

Group B

Knockout stage

Semi-finals

Bronze medal match

Gold medal match

Winners

Medal winners

References 
Garin, Erik. "South East Asian Games 1981 (Manila)". RSSSF. Retrieved 2010-03-30.
SEA Games 1981. AFF official website

Southeast
Southeast
Football at the Southeast Asian Games
International association football competitions hosted by the Philippines